Coleomethia xanthocollis is a species of beetle in the family Cerambycidae. It was described by Knull in 1935.

References

Methiini
Beetles described in 1935